Rakesh Sharma (born 1949) was the first Indian astronaut.

Rakesh Sharma may also refer to:
Rakesh Sharma (IAS) (born 1955), Indian businessman
Rakesh Sharma (banker) (born 1958), Indian banker
Rakesh Sharma (cricketer) (born 1972), Omani cricketer
Rakesh Sharma (filmmaker) (fl. 2000s–2010s), Indian filmmaker